The 1995 Webster's World Matchplay was the second annual World Matchplay darts tournament organised by the World Darts Council (WDC, which became the Professional Darts Corporation in 1997). The Winter Gardens, Blackpool played host to the event for the second year running, and it took place between 31 July–5 August 1995.

Seven former world champions were in the field. Defending champion Larry Butler beat one of them, Eric Bristow, in the first round. Butler's title defence ended with a quarter-final defeat to Dennis Priestley, the man he beat to win the title the previous year.

Jocky Wilson made what turned out to be his last appearance in a televised tournament at this event. The two-time former World Champion beat Rod Harrington in the first round, but then lost to Nigel Justice in the second round.

Phil Taylor and Dennis Priestley continued their rivalry when they met in another major final. This time it was Taylor who came out on top by 16 legs to 11 to claim his first World Matchplay title.

Prize money
The prize fund was £42,400.

Seeds
 Rod Harrington
 Phil Taylor
 Bob Anderson
 Dennis Priestley
 Peter Evison
 Kevin Spiolek
 Alan Warriner
 Shayne Burgess

Results

Third place playoff (best of 21 legs)
 Cliff Lazarenko 3–11 John Lowe

References

World Matchplay (darts)
World Matchplay Darts